Econometric Theory is an economics journal specialising in econometrics, published by Cambridge Journals. Its current editor is Peter Phillips. It is one of the main econometrics journals.

The journal was founded against a backdrop of strong growth in econometrics research in 1985. At the time of its foundation, a main goal was to support theoretical developments in econometrics. Whereas many early articles focused exclusively on theory, disregarding practical applications, it became standard practice to include empirical illustrations or simulations in recent decades.

References 

 . Also published as a University of Cyprus, Department of Economics Working Paper 01-10

External links 
Homepage

Econometrics journals
Publications established in 1985
Cambridge University Press academic journals
Bimonthly journals